Lê Hồng Phong High School for the Gifted (formerly Petrus Ký High School) is a highly selective high school in Hồ Chí Minh City, Vietnam. Established in 1927, the school is one of the oldest high schools still operating in Vietnam.

History

Lê Hồng Phong High School for the Gifted was the third high school founded in Saigon by French colonizers, after the Collège Chasseloup-Laubat (now Le Quy Don High School) and Collège de Jeunes Filles Indigènes (now Nguyễn Thị Minh Khai High School). In 1925, Architect Ernest Hebrard was commissioned to design the school in Chợ Quán.

On 28 November 1927, a temporary branch of Collège Chasseloup-Laubat, called Collège de Cochinchine, was founded in Chợ Quán for native students. The branch was under the management of the Board at Collège Chasseloup-Laubat. 

The construction of the school was completed in 1928. On 11 August 1928, the interim Governor-General of French Indochina, René Robert, signed Decree no. 3116 to establish a native French secondary school (Lycée), combining Collège de Cochinchine and about 200 pupils from Collège Chasseloup Laubat. The Governor Blanchard de la Brosse named the school Lycée Petrus Trương Vĩnh Ký, in honour of Vietnamese Catholic scholar Pétrus Trương Vĩnh Ký. The school was known as Petrus Ký High School for almost a half-century.

Lycée Petrus Truong Vinh Ky, commonly referred to as Lycée Petrus, commenced the first day on October 1, 1928. The first principal was Mr. Sainte Luce Banchelin, the bureau's Mr. Boulé, the banker Mahé. The chairman of the board is Mr. Gazano and the Vietnamese members are: Mr. Nguyen Thanh Giung, Ph.D., chemist, contract professor, Mr. Ho Bao Toan and Mr. Tran Le Quat. The officials are parents French commissioners Sainte Luce Banchelin and Mahé. The president is the Principal and the members are: John, Painting Professor, Mr. Paquier, Professor of Literature, Mr. Nguyen Van Nho, Professor of Literature, Mr. Nguyen Van Thuong, and supervisor and secretary is Mr. Boulé.

There are two levels of study: Enseignement primaire supérieur Franco-indigène (DEPSI) and French Secondary (enseignement secondaire Franco-indigène).

The first course consisted of 10 students who received a partial scholarship and 43 students who received a full scholarship. This grade was divided into 3 classes: 1ère année, 2ème année and 3ème année. 18 classes: 3 classes 4ème année, 5 classes 3ème année, 5 classes 2ème année and 5 classes 1ère année. In this school year, Tran Van Trach, special commissioner of Nam Ky Governor bought books for the Petrus Ky Library. In the school year 1928-1929 was the subject of social concern through an article published in the newspaper La Tribune Indochinoise on January 4, 1929 with content Lycée Petrus Ky for native students treated as relatives. After the paper, in the second academic year, Mr. Banchelin was renamed and Mr. Paul Valencot, a professorial master of master's degree, was appointed principal in August 1929 and the Governor of Nam appointed Mr. Renault, chairman of the Cholon Marketing Board, replacing Mr. Gazano as the chairman of the board.

In 1941, the school was temporarily relocated to the Pedagogical College of Saigon due to the war. It resumed its regular teaching activities in the same year, at its own establishment. In 1945, the school was temporarily closed after evacuating to Tan Dinh school district. It re-opened in April 1946 in a seminary on Lucien Mossard street. It returned to Chợ Quán in the year 1947.

In 1961, it became a secondary school in the Southern Vietnamese educational system. In 1976, the school was renamed after a former general secretary of the Communist Party of Vietnam, Lê Hồng Phong, and became a high school. In 1990, it was made a high school for the gifted students. Its current name is Lê Hồng Phong High School for the Gifted.

Institution

A faculty of about 160 teachers, chosen from the top candidates at the Ho Chi Minh City Pedagogical University, serves about 2400 students in three grades from 10th to 12th. Lê Hồng Phong conducts a rigorous entrance examination for admission. Its long-standing prestige as the foremost high school in the area attracts many applicants from South Vietnam and the competition is fierce.  Students sit for exams in mathematics, literature, foreign language (mostly English), and must write a paper on one of the eleven subjects offered in the classes for majors. Students applying for the bilingual Vietnamese-French programme are admitted on a different panel. 

In the 2006–07 academic year, the school admitted 250 students into 12 classes for majors and 400 students into 8 classes for non-majors. 

The school offers 12 classes for majors, each specialising in a single subject: Mathematics, Physics, Computer science, Chemistry, Biology, Geography, History, Literature, English, French, Chinese and Japanese. Students in these classes do not have to pay tuition fees.  Students in those courses are awarded a significant scholarship if they are at the top 30% of students at the end of the semester.

Upon applying to Lê Hồng Phong, applicants must either specify the major they would like to apply for, or select the Section in which they want to predominantly study in for non-major classes. A section is a study programme in which the student chooses to specialize in three out of the eleven mandatory subjects which corresponds to the College and University entrance exam system in Vietnam. The entrance examination papers for each section differ in level of difficulty of each subject.

 Section A: Mathematics, Physics and Chemistry.
 Section B: Mathematics, Chemistry and Biology.
 Section C: Literature, History and Geography.
 Section D: Mathematics, Literature and foreign languages.

Students in the classes for non-majors pay nominal tuitions. The bilingual French-Vietnamese programme is taught in both languages. At the end of 12th grade, students attend two examinations: the Vietnamese National Baccalaureate and the Bilingual Baccalaureate recognized by the Francophone community. The prominent student organisation at Lê Hồng Phong is the Youth Division of the Communist Party of Vietnam. The organisation organises annual recreational and charity events, many of which have become school traditions.

Almost 100% of the school's students pass the National Baccalaureate examination and more than 90% gain entrance to universities and colleges.  The school is a strong contestant in the national and international student academic competitions. In the 2006–2007 school year, 291 students from Lê Hồng Phong won the City Student Academic Aptitude competition in 12 subjects and 23 students won the National competitions.

Lê Hồng Phong, together with High School for the Gifted (Phổ Thông Năng Khiếu) and Trần Đại Nghĩa High School, make up the Big 3 of "Highly selective" schools (trường chuyên) in Hồ Chí Minh City and in Southern Vietnam, having achieved significant numbers of awards in both domestic and international academic competitions.

Recognitions
 In 1989, the school was awarded the 3rd Level Labour Medal by the President of Vietnam.
 In 2001, the school was awarded the 2nd Level Labour Medal by the President of Vietnam.
 In 2007, the school was awarded the 1st Level Labour Medal by the President of Vietnam.

Staff
The school has 20 departments whose staff bear different responsibilities of teaching and operating the institution.

In 2018, Le Hong Phong department of Mathematics has 26 teachers who are graduated from the higher education system, including 1 doctor, 8 masters and many teachers who are studying postgraduate. Group teachers are well-versed in their teaching and have extensive experience in teaching, actively contributing to the school's activities, training generations of excellent students for the City and Country. The dynamic and creative young teachers have great potential to take part in teaching profession and fostering good students effectively. The Maths Team is a solid, friendly, professional, experienced and enthusiastic team. Following the textbook program of the Ministry of Education, the Mathematical Team organizes the application of unified documents for each block 10, 11, 12 very effectively. Mathematical teams take the lead in applying information technology to teaching and there is always innovation in teaching methods. In addition, the Math Club offers an extra-curricular course for students to solve mathematical calculations using Casio's pocket calculator and has achieved high rankings in both the City and State levels. For many years, the team has won the title of "Excellent Labor Collective" - many of them have received certificates of merit from the People's Committee, the Ministry of Education and Training, the Prime Minister and many other noble rewards. Other achievements in teaching and fostering good students.

Academic reputation
In 2018, the school admitted fewer 500 highest-scored students (from the total 3252 applicants that are widely considered to be the most competitive out of 70,054 students in the same year)  through the annual year-10 academic entrance examination. The school has remained the most selective one in South Vietnam for nearly a century, since its establishment.

Petrus Ky students in the war era

In 1940, the Petrus Ký Student Club was founded. The club organised extra-curricular activities including performing arts, sports, camping, attracting students from within and outside Petrus Ký. It was during this time that the students Lưu Hữu Phước and Mai Văn Bộ  (later ambassador) wrote "La Marche des Étudiants" song, the predecessor of the patriotic "Tiếng Gọi Thanh Niên (Call to the Young)", "Tiếng Gọi Công Dân (Call to the Citizens)" and "Quốc Ca của Việt Nam Cộng Hòa (The National Anthem of the Republic of Vietnam, National anthem of South Vietnam)".

Within a year, the club and its activities were prohibited by the French-Indochina government. In 1942, Petrus Ký students, inspired by students in Hanoi, founded an organisation named S.E.T. (Section Exécution Tourisme). The organisation functioned as a scout programme aiming at developing character, citizenship, and personal fitness qualities. During this time, several Petrus Ký professors such as Phạm Thiều, Lê Văn Chí and Trần Văn Thanh, also subtly professed their patriotism in lectures.

As France re-occupied Vietnam, in 1948, Petrus Ký students were the leaders in the movement "Teach and Learn in Vietnamese". On 10 September 1949, the first day of the academic year, students of several schools together with scholars and parents went on strike.   The government closed Petrus Ký and Gia Long schools and imprisoned a number of students. 

On 9 January 1950, over 2000 students from Petrus Ký, Gia Long, Áo tím and Kỹ Thuật [...] protested in front of the Ministry of Education  and then the Governor Palace. The government tried to disperse the crowd; however, the number of protesters had risen to more than 50,000. Three days later, the city went on strike to attend On's funeral. Students from Mỹ Tho, Cần Thơ, Huế, and Hanoi came to Saigon to participate in the ceremony, carrying protest banners. More than 1,000,000 people were present at the funeral. This was the largest funeral in Saigon since that of Phan Chu Trinh in 1925. 

On 14 July 1954, Petrus Ký student started the movement to demand independence and democracy at the school by drawing slogans on walls and blackboards, openly supporting the Geneva Accord. On 30 March 1955, conflicts between the national army and Bình Xuyên arms broke out. Bình Xuyên's volunteer force stationed itself at Petrus Ký. On 30 April 1955, the national army expelled Bình Xuyên. On 1 May 1955, Petrus Ký students formed a committee to help victims of the conflict. The committee was able to gather considerable amount of money and aid for the people. 

In 1970, Petrus Ký students organised a strike and a take-over of the Cambodian Embassy to protest against Lon Nol's massacre of Vietnamese expats living in Cambodia. In 1972, Nguyen Thai Binh, a school alumnus studying in the United States, participated in anti-war demonstrations and wrote a letter to then U.S. President Nixon condemning crimes against the Vietnamese people. While being deported from the U.S. back to Vietnam, he attempted to hijack the Pan American 747 as it approached Saigon. He was shot dead by a vacationing American police officer. 

On 30 April 1975, the South Vietnam Liberation Force, headed by General Trần Văn Trà, was stationed at the school. The school was temporarily closed until July 1975, then the class of 1974-1975 took their final examinations and graduated in September 1975.

Principals

Notable alumni
 Trần Đại Nghĩa, military scientist, ingénieur, inventor
 , Professor in Mathematics, Georgia Institute of Technology, known for Le-Murakami-Ohtsuki invariant.
 Lê Diệp Kiều Trang, Businesswoman, Ex-director of Facebook and GoJek in Vietnam  
 Trần Minh Triết, Vice President of University of Science, VNU-HCM 
 Cathy Thao Tran, Founder of Ohana
 Do Cao Tri - Army of the Republic of Vietnam general, commander of III Corps
 Le Minh Dao - Army of the Republic of Vietnam general, commander of the 18th Division

Politics and law
 Nguyễn Văn Chì
 , political activist
 Huỳnh Tấn Phát
 
 
 
 Trương Tấn Sang, seventh president of Vietnam
 Nguyễn Minh Triết, sixth president of Vietnam
 , anti-Vietnam war activist in United States
 Nguyễn Tiến Trung
 Tran Ngoc Lieng - lawyer

Culture
 Trúc Hồ
 Trần Văn Khê, Honorary Member of the International Music Council of UNESCO, director of research at CNRS and professor at the Sorbonne
 
 
 
 Lưu Hữu Phước, recipient of the Hồ Chí Minh Prize in 1996
 
 Trần Lê
 Cẩm Ly, pop singer in Vietnam war era
 
 
 , popular R&B  singing star
 Tóc Tiên
 Uyên Linh, winner of the third season of Vietnam Idol in 2010
 Cao Toàn Mỹ

References

External links
  (in Vietnamese)
 Tuyển sinh trường THPT Chuyên Lê Hồng Phong TPHCM (in Vietnamese)

1927 establishments in Vietnam
Educational institutions established in 1927
High schools for the gifted in Vietnam
High schools in Ho Chi Minh City
High schools in Vietnam
Schools in Vietnam